The Skoda 7.5 cm Gebirgskanone M. 15 was a mountain gun used by Austria-Hungary in World War I. In German service, it was known as the 7.5 cm GebK 15. The Italians designated them as the Obice da 75/13 and the Wehrmacht would designate captured guns as 7.5 cm GebK 259(i) after the surrender of Italy in 1943.

History
Its development was quite prolonged, as the Austrians couldn't decide on the specifications that they wanted. Initially, they wanted a gun that could be broken down into no more than five pack-animal loads to replace the various 7 cm mountain guns in service, but prolonged trials proved that the 7.5 cm M. 12 prototype to be the best gun. However, the commander-in-chief of Bosnia-Hercegovina believe it to be too heavy and demanded a return to the 7 cm caliber to save weight. Skoda dutifully built enough guns for a test battery in the smaller caliber and tested them during the spring of 1914 where they were judged inferior to the 7.5 cm guns. This cost the Austrians heavily as the 7.5 cm guns began to be delivered in April 1915 instead of the planned date of April 1914.

For transport, the gun could be dismantled into six parts, generally carried in four loads. In addition, there was a Gun shield fitted on some (perhaps many) such guns. A revised version of this gun was released as the Skoda 75 mm Model 1928.  The Germans bought some guns during World War I, but used them as infantry guns in direct support of the infantry, as their light weight would allow them to move with the infantry. They complained that the guns were too fragile and didn't have a high enough muzzle velocity to act as an anti-tank gun. Considering that the guns were designed to be disassembled, it is not too surprising that they couldn't stand the abuse moving through the shell-pocketed front lines on the Western Front.

Surviving examples 

Serial number 1399 (manufactured 1917) is displayed in Bundaberg, Queensland, having been gifted to that city as a war trophy, in 1921, by the Australian Government.

Another, also repatriated in the 1920s, serves as a memorial to the men and women of the armed forces in Tuamarina Cemetery, Marlborough, New Zealand.

Notes

References 
 Englemann, Joachim and Scheibert, Horst. Deutsche Artillerie 1934-1945: Eine Dokumentation in Text, Skizzen und Bildern: Ausrüstung, Gliderung, Ausbildung, Führung, Einsatz. Limburg/Lahn, Germany: C. A. Starke, 1974
 Gander, Terry and Chamberlain, Peter. Weapons of the Third Reich: An Encyclopedic Survey of All Small Arms, Artillery and Special Weapons of the German Land Forces 1939-1945. New York: Doubleday, 1979 
 Hogg, Ian. Twentieth-Century Artillery. New York: Barnes & Noble Books, 2000 
 Jäger, Herbert. German Artillery of World War One. Ramsbury, Marlborough, Wiltshire: Crowood Press, 2001 
 Ortner, M. Christian. The Austro-Hungarian Artillery From 1867 to 1918: Technology, Organization, and Tactics. Vienna, Verlag Militaria, 2007

External links 

 GebK M. 15 on Landships

World War I mountain artillery
World War II mountain artillery
Artillery of Czechoslovakia
World War II artillery of Italy
75 mm artillery
World War I artillery of Austria-Hungary